Gordon Johnstone may refer to:

 Gordon Johnstone (cricketer) (1885–1961), Australian cricketer
 Gordon Johnstone (footballer) (1900–1961), English footballer